How To Be An American Housewife is a 2010 novel by Margaret Dilloway. It is based on the experiences of Dilloway's mother, who was a Japanese war bride.

Synopsis
The book tells the story of Shoko Morgan, a mother of two and wife to American GI Charlie. Shoko decided to contact her brother Taro, whom she last saw when she married Charlie at the end of World War II. However, she is too ill to return her country. Shoko asked her daughter Sue and granddaughter to go to Japan to find her uncle to discover her mother's life secret.

Characters
Shoko Morgan - A Japanese Woman who married American GI, with whom she had 2 children 
Suiko (Sue) Morgan - Shoko's and Charlie's daughter and sister to Mike and niece to Taro
Charlie Morgan - Shoko's husband and Mike's and Sue's father is an Irish-American GI who is kindhearted yet shy
Mike Morgan - Shoko's and Charlie's son and older brother of Sue
Taro - Shoko's younger brother and uncle to Sue and Mike, who hates Americans, retired from being a school principal 
Mille Morgan - Charlie's mother, who become Shoko's mother in law and grandmother to Mike and Sue
Nanny - a babysitter whom Shoko disliked as a child
Craig - Sue's ex-husband and Helena's father, who married her at age of 20
Suki - Taro's and Shoko's sister.
Ronin - an Eta whom Shoko fell in love with, born to an English father and Japanese mother. He and Shoko were lovers. He was killed by Testuo
Testuo - Taro's childhood friend, who was engaged to Shoko until he cheated on her with her friend Yuki.
Toyoko - Japanese wife of black soldier
Jim - Toyoko's husband
Kyle Leonard - An American general who met Shoko
Lorraine- A neighbor of Charlie and Shoko
Dr Cunningham - Shoko's doctor
Helena - Sue's and Craig's 13-year-old daughter
Dr Su : Shoko's doctor is a Chinese-American
Toshiro : A Japanese traveler who met Sue and Helena
Yasuo Takana - Suki's son is a teacher at Ukei High School who met his cousin Sue
Hiroshi - Yasuo's lover 
Sumiko - Taro's granddaughter, who met Sue and Helena 
Taro-chan- Sumiko's four-year-old son, who shared his name with his great-grandfather

Awards
The book was a John Gardner Fiction Award Finalist in 2011.

References

External links
Goodreads
 http://www.readinggroupguides.com/guides_h/how_to_be_an_american_housewife1.asp

2010 American novels

Novels set in Japan
Novels based on actual events
G. P. Putnam's Sons books
Japan in non-Japanese culture